is a railway station in the city of Katagami, Akita, Japan, operated by East Japan Railway Company (JR East).

Lines
Ōkubo Station is served by the Ōu Main Line, and is located 318.9 km from the terminus of the line at Fukushima Station.

Station layout
Ōkubo Station has one side platform and one island platform serving three tracks, connected by a footbridge. Track 3 is used primarily for freight trains changing direction, so th layout is effectively that of two side platforms. The station is staffed.

Platforms

History
Ōkubo Station opened on October 21, 1902. The station was absorbed into the JR East network upon the privatization of JNR on April 1, 1987.

Passenger statistics
In fiscal 2018, the station was used by an average of 400 passengers daily (boarding passengers only).

Surrounding area
 
 
 Ōkubo Post Office

References

External links

 JR East Station information 

Railway stations in Akita Prefecture
Ōu Main Line
Railway stations in Japan opened in 1902
Katagami, Akita